Kvina is a river in Southern Norway. The river has a  watershed. The river is rich in fish. The river runs through the villages of Netland, Storekvina, and Liknes.

Power generation
The river passes through a number of lakes that are regulated for hydropower including the Roskreppfjorden, Øyarvatn, Kvifjorden, and Homstølvatnet. The hydropower is utilized in several power stations along the river. The largest is the Tonstad Hydroelectric Power Station in Sirdal. About half of the water is transferred out of the Kvina to the Tonstad plant.

References

Rivers of Agder
Kvinesdal
Valle, Norway
Rivers of Norway